Zelda Sears (née Paldi; January 21, 1873 – February 19, 1935) was an American actress, screenwriter, novelist and businesswoman.

Early life and background 
She was born as Zelda Paldi near Brockway Township, St. Clair County, Michigan, into a multi-lingual family that spoke French, Italian and English. Her father, Justin Lewis Paldi, was a first-generation Italian immigrant engineer and horse breeder,  and her mother Roxa Tyler was of English heritage.

Her entry into the job market at age 12 was borne out of a family financial crisis. Merchant L.A. Sherman conducted an essay contest for his store's opening day, with Sears submitting the winning entry and being rewarded with a position as cash runner for the sales staff. In the evening hours, she educated herself on secretarial skills. She was eventually promoted to the position of sales clerk. When she expressed an interest in writing, Sherman transferred her as a reporter on his newspaper the Port Huron Daily Times.

In June 1889, at age 16, she made her acting debut as alternating roles in a Port Huron production of Esther at the City Opera House. Setting her sights on a newspaper career, she journeyed to Detroit, Michigan, with no luck finding a job, and then ventured to Chicago, Illinois. While rooming at the Chicago YWCA, and waiting for her big break in the newspaper business, she worked for Longnecker and Company painting flowers on boxes. She earned extra money by selling her original greeting card verses.

Acting and writing careers
In 1892, she married actor Herbert E. Sears, and would continue to use his name professionally after the dissolution of their marriage three years later. She got her foot in the door of the Chicago Herald newspaper by contributing to its humor column. When her father died, Sears began reading the numerous play scripts in his extensive personal library, adding to her already considerable interest in the profession. Actress Sarah Bernhardt performed in at Chicago's Daly Theater in 1894, and Sears initially set out to secure an interview with the star for the Herald. She ended up being hired as an extra in the production, changing the course of her professional life. Later continuing with a local acting stock company, and honing her craft with Hart Conway's American Conservatory of Acting, she eventually relocated to New York. Producer A.L. Erlanger offered her a small role as one of the ballerinas, a skill she had to learn on the job, in the 1896 production of  Jack and the Beanstalk at the Casino Theatre. She spent the next few years expanding her skills with traveling stock companies.

As she continued to pursue acting roles, Sears operated her own public stenography/typewriting service in New York, near the Empire Theatre on Broadway.  Her clients were theatre people, playwrights. She soon developed into a proficient script doctor, with an eye towards becoming a playwright herself. It was during her 1900 performance as the jealous murderess La Colombe in Wine and Women at the Boston Theatre, that she met her future collaborator, playwright Clyde Fitch. He offered her a part in his new play Lover's Lane. While continuing her professional relationship with Fitch, including as his script doctor, she took a full-time job with theatrical producer Henry Wilson Savage. The company's vice president Louis C. Wiswell would eventually become her second husband. Under Fitch's influence, performing in seven plays written by him, she began to develop the stage persona she would become most identified with, a spinster wise in years but eternally yearning for marriage. Journalist Ada Patterson would later proclaim Sears "The Greatest of Stage Old Maids".

She began writing for films at the request of Cecil B. DeMille and MGM in the early 1920s, and continued to do so for more than a decade.

Death 
On August 6, 1918, Sears married her long-time friend Louis C. Wiswell. She died at age 62 in her Hollywood home in 1935, from undisclosed causes. She was survived by Wiswell, and a sister, Marie Paldi.

Stage 
Partial listing:

Filmography

References

Sourcing

External links 

 
 
 Portrait of Zelda Sears, NY Public Library Billy Rose Collection
 1913 portrait (University of Washington, Sayre Collection)

1873 births
1935 deaths
Actresses from Michigan
American dramatists and playwrights
American film actresses
19th-century American actresses
American stage actresses
American writers of Italian descent
People from St. Clair County, Michigan
Vaudeville performers
American women screenwriters
Screenwriters from Michigan
20th-century American women writers
20th-century American screenwriters